Amrinder Singh Brar, (born 29 November 1977) popularly known as Amrinder Singh Raja Warring, is an Indian politician and MLA who served as Transport Minister of the state of Punjab, India under the Government of Charanjit Singh Channi. He was awarded the title of "Raja Warring" by Congress circles.

Political career 
Warring was also  president of the Indian Youth Congress, the youth division of Indian National Congress, from December 2014 to May 2018.

MLA Gidderbaha 
An elected Member of Legislative Assembly from Gidderbaha, district Sri Muktsar Sahib, Punjab to the Punjab Legislative Assembly.

MLA second term
In March 2017, he was elected as an MLA for the second successive time, after completing his first term from 2012–2017. He served as the Transport Minister in the Punjab government.

Warring contested from Bathinda constituency in the  2019 Indian general election against Harsimrat Kaur Badal but lost by a large margin due to his statement supporting Jagdish Tytler's "heroics" in the 1984 Anti-Sikh Riots.

MLA third term
During the campaign for the 2022 Punjab Legislative Assembly election, Warring sang songs and danced during his public meetings. His associates said this was done "to strike a chord with commoners". He won the election. The Aam Aadmi Party gained a strong 79% majority in the sixteenth Punjab Legislative Assembly by winning 92 out of 117 seats in the 2022 Punjab Legislative Assembly election. MP Bhagwant Mann was sworn in as Chief Minister on 16 March 2022.

In March 2022, when CM designate Bhagwant Mann took steps to end the VIP culture and ordered to withdraw police security from 122 former MLAs and ministers. A total of 384 policemen of the state, involved in the security of those politicians were transferred to their parent unit. Mann had stated that the police force was needed for security of the people and not VIPs. As ordered, 21 security personnel, the largest in the list were withdrawn from the service of Warring. On 9 April 2022, Warring was appointed by the national leadership of Congress as the chief of Congress in Punjab.

Family 
Born to Kuldeep Singh and Malkeet Kaur, he lost his parents when he was still a child, and was brought up by his maternal uncles, later brought up by Sindhwani Family. He is married to Amrita J. Singh, and he has a son and a daughter. He was earlier known as Raja Sotha, with Sotha being the name of his maternal village. Later, he began using the name of his paternal village called Warring.

References

State cabinet ministers of Punjab, India
Living people
Indian National Congress politicians
Punjab, India MLAs 2012–2017
Punjab, India MLAs 2017–2022
Punjab, India MLAs 2022–2027
Transport Ministers of Punjab, India
1970 births
Indian National Congress politicians from Punjab, India